Year 972 (CMLXXII) was a leap year starting on Monday (link will display the full calendar) of the Julian calendar.

Events 
 By place 

 Byzantine Empire 
 Spring – Emperor John I Tzimiskes divides the Bulgarian territories, recently held by the Kievan Rus', into six new themes. He turns his attention to the East against the Abbasid Caliphate and its vassals, beginning with an invasion of Upper Mesopotamia. John transfers Byzantine troops to Macedonia, and the region of Philippopolis in Thrace, to dilute the Slavs.
 John I removes various Bulgarian boyars from their homes, and settles them in Constantinople and Anatolia (modern Turkey), where they are given high titles and lands.
 John I grants a charter for the Monastic Republic of Holy Mount Athos, in Greece.

 Europe 
 Spring – Grand Prince Sviatoslav I is ambushed by the Pechenegs (possibly in the service of the Byzantines) and killed during his attempt to cross the Dnieper rapids (modern Ukraine). His skull is made into a drinking cup. Sviatoslav is succeeded by his eldest son Yaropolk I as ruler of Kiev, which leads to a civil war with his brother Oleg. 
 April 14 – Otto II (the Red), joint-ruler and son of Otto I (the Great), marries the Byzantine princess Theophanu (niece or granddaughter of John I). She is crowned empress by Pope John XIII at Rome. Creating an alliance between the Ottonian Dynasty and the Byzantine Empire (called the Tzimiscian Peace).
 June 24 – Battle of Cedynia: The Polans under prince (or Duke) Mieszko I, defeat the German forces of the Saxon count Odo I at their stronghold in Cedynia (with the help of hidden reinforcements). The battle – one of the first in Polish history – strengthens Mieszko's hold over Western Pomerania.

 Africa 
 Buluggin ibn Ziri is appointed viceroy in Ifriqiya (modern Tunisia) and becomes the first ruler (emir) of the Zirid Dynasty.

 By topic 

 Religion 
 September 6 – John XIII dies at Rome after a 6-year reign. He is succeeded by Benedict VI as the 134th pope of the Catholic Church.
 The monastery at the site of Peterborough Cathedral is rebuilt by Dunstan, archbishop of Canterbury.

Births 
 January 16 – Sheng Zong, emperor of the Liao Dynasty (d. 1031)
 March 27 – Robert II (the Pious), king of France (d. 1031)
Abdussamed Babek,  Kurdish ulama, author and poet (d. 1019/1020)
 Al-Mawardi, Abbasid jurist and diplomat (d. 1058)
 Ermesinde, countess and regent of Barcelona (d. 1058)
 Fujiwara no Seishi, Japanese empress consort (d. 1025)
 Fujiwara no Yukinari, Japanese calligrapher (d. 1027)
 Gregory V, pope of the Catholic Church (d. 999)
 Ramon Borrell, count of Barcelona (d. 1017)

Deaths 
 September 6 – John XIII, pope of the Catholic Church
 December 18 (or 973) – Eberhard IV, Frankish nobleman (or 973)
 Ælfwold I (or Ælfweald), bishop of Crediton
 Arnulf II, count of Boulogne (approximate date)
 Boleslaus I (the Cruel), duke of Bohemia (or 967)
 Feng Yanlu, Chinese official (approximate date)
 Fujiwara no Koretada, Japanese statesman (b. 924)
 Khottiga Amoghavarsha, ruler of the Rashtrakuta Empire
 Kūya, Japanese priest of Pure Land Buddhism (b. 903)
 Liutprand, Lombard bishop and historian
 Sviatoslav I (Igorevich), Grand Prince of Kiev

References